Kees Vermunt (22 May 1931 – 16 September 2019) was a Dutch professional football player and manager, known for his long association with RBC.

References

1931 births
2019 deaths
Dutch footballers
Dutch football managers
RBC Roosendaal players
RBC Roosendaal managers
RKC Waalwijk managers
Sportspeople from Roosendaal
Association footballers not categorized by position
Footballers from North Brabant
Association football forwards